Sergius  is a male given name of Ancient Roman origin after the name of the Latin gens Sergia or Sergii of regal and republican ages. It is a common Christian name, in honor of Saint Sergius, or in Russia, of Sergius of the Holy Caves, one of saint Fathers of Kyiv, Saint Sergius of Radonezh, and has been the name of four popes. It has given rise to numerous variants, present today mainly in the Romance (Serge, Sergio, Sergi) and Slavic languages (Serhii, Sergey, Serguei, Srđan). It is not common in English, although the Anglo-French name Sergeant is possibly related to it.

Etymology
The name originates from the Roman nomen (patrician family name) Sergius, after the name of the Roman gens of Latin origins Sergia or Sergii from Alba Longa, Old Latium, counted by Theodor Mommsen as one of the oldest Roman families, one of the original 100 gentes originarie. It has been speculated to derive from a more ancient Etruscan name but the etymology of the nomen Sergius is problematic. Chase hesitantly suggests a connection with the praenomen Servius, probably from an old Latin root meaning "to preserve" or "keep safe".

It became a personal name in Roman imperial times and spread to the Byzantine Empire in the Greek form Sergios (Σέργιος). It became popular in Christianity in honor of the fourth-century martyr and saint Sergius, especially among Roman ecclesiastics of Syrian extraction, starting in the seventh century.

Sergei was the second most popular name in Russia in the 1980s. In the Middle Ages in Western Europe it fell into disuse. It became widespread again in the 1800s through translations of Russian literature, especially French translations.

Worldwide
Its form varies by language:

Albanian: Serxho
 (Sarkis or Sarjoun) (Arab Christian name)
  (Sargis or Sarkis) 
  (Sargis)
 
 
  (Siarhei or Siarhiej), diminutive  (Siarheika )
 
  (Sergei or Sergey)
  
  (Sergii or Sergiy)
 
 
 
  
 
  (Sergo)
  (Sergios or Seryios) 
 
 
 
 
 
 
  
  
  
  (Sergei, Sergey), Russian diminutive 
 
 
 
 
  (Serhii , Serhiy, Sergiy or Sergii), diminutive  (Serhiiko , Serhiyko or Sergiyko).

Given names

List of people with given name Sergius
Pope Sergius I
Pope Sergius II
Pope Sergius III
Pope Sergius IV

List of notable people with given name Serge
Serge Abiteboul (born 1953), French computer scientist
Serge Adda (1948–2004), president of the French television station TV5
Serge Akakpo (born 1987), Togolese footballer
Grand Duke Sergei Alexandrovich of Russia (1857–1905), son of Emperor Alexander II of Russia
Serge Ambomo (born 1986), Cameroonian boxer
Serge Andreoni (born 1940), member of the Senate of France
Serge Ankri (born 1949), film director
Serge Aubin (born 1975), Canadian professional ice hockey centre
Serge Aubry (1942–2011), Canadian professional ice hockey goaltender
Serge Aurier (born 1992), Ivorian footballer
Serge Avédikian (born 1955), Armenian-French film and theatre actor, director, writer, and producer
Serge Ayeli (born 1981), Ivorian football striker
Serge Dikulu Bageta (born 1978), Congolese footballer
Serge Baguet (born 1969), Belgian former professional road bicycle racer
Raymond-Serge Balé (born 1949), Congolese diplomat and Congo-Brazzaville's Permanent Representative to the United Nations since 2008
Serge Théophile Balima (born 1949), Burkinabé journalist, diplomat, and professor of the University of Ouagadougou
Serge van den Ban (born 1980), Dutch football goalkeeper
Serge Baudo (born 1927), French conductor
Serge Beaudoin (born 1952), Canadian former professional ice hockey player
Serge de Beketch (1946–2007), French journalist, story writer for cartoons, and writer linked to the extreme-right
Serge Bélanger, Canadian former politician
Serge Bengono (born 1977), Cameroonian sprinter who specializes in the 100 metres
Serge Bernier (born 1947), Canadian retired professional ice hockey right winger
Serge Betsen (born 1974), French rugby union player
Serge Bezème (born 1977), Ivorian professional football player
Serge Bindy (born 1954), Swiss modern pentathlete
Serge Moléon Blaise (born 1951), Haitian painter
Serge Blanc (footballer) (born 1972), French former football player
Serge Blanco (born 1958), French former rugby union footballer
Serge Blisko (born 1950), French politician and a member of the National Assembly of France
Serge Blusson (1928–1994), French cyclist
Serge Boisvert (born 1959), Canadian former ice hockey player
Jean-Serge Bokassa (born 1972), Central African politician and the Central African Republic's Minister of the Interior since 2016
Serge Lofo Bongeli (born 1983), DR Congolese football player
Constant-Serge Bounda, Ph.D. (born 1966), Congolese national and United Nations Environment Programme (UNEP) Representative to the African Union
Serge Bourguignon (born 1928), French film director and screenwriter
Serge Boutouli, footballer from the Central African Republic
Serge Bramly (born 1949), French language writer and essayist
Serge Brammertz (born 1962), Belgian jurist and the chief prosecutor for the International Residual Mechanism for Criminal Tribunals since 2016
Serge Branco (born 1980), Cameroonian retired footballer
Serge Brignoni (1903–2002), Swiss avant-garde painter and sculptor
Serge Brunier (born 1958), French photographer, reporter, and writer who has specialized in popular depictions of astronomical subjects
Serge Brussolo (born 1951), French writer
Serge Cadorin (1961–2007), Belgian football striker
Serge Cajfinger, French creator of the ready-to-wear clothing brand Paule Ka
Serge Cardin (born 1950), Canadian politician
Serge Carrière O.C., M.D., C.S.P.Q., F.R.C.P.(C), Canadian physiologist, physician, and educator
Serge Chaloff (1923–1957), American jazz baritone saxophonist
Serge Chapleau (born 1945), French-Canadian political cartoonist from the province of Québec
Serge Chermayeff (1900–1996), Russian-born British architect, industrial designer, writer, and co-founder of several architectural societies
Serge Chiesa (born 1950), French former professional footballer
Serge Clair (born 1940), Mauritian politician and the Chief Commissioner of Rodrigues from 2003–2006
Serge Clerc (born 1957), French comic book artist and illustrator
Issa Serge Coelo (born 1967), Chadian film director
Serge Collot (1923–2015), French violist and music educator
Serge Conus (1902–1988), Russian pianist and composer
Serge Corbin, Canadian professional marathon canoe racer
Serge Crasnianski (born 1942), French entrepreneur who founded the Grenoble-based Key Independent System (KIS)
Serge Daan (1940–2018), Dutch scientist, known for his significant contributions to the field of Chronobiology
Serge Daney (1944–1992), French movie critic
Serge Danot (1931–1990), French animator and former advertising executive
Serge Dassault (1925–2018), French billionaire heir, businessman, and conservative politician
Serge Deble or Serges Déblé (born 1989), Ivorian professional football player
Serge Dedina (born 1964), American mayor in Imperial Beach, California and the Executive Director of the non-profit environmentalist group Wildcoast
Serge Delaive (born 1965), Belgian poet and novelist writing in the French language
Serge Demierre (born 1956), Swiss professional road bicycle racer
Serge Deslières (born 1947), Canadian former politician and teacher
Serge Despres (born 1978), Canadian bobsledder from Cocagne, New Brunswick who competed from 2000–2006
Serge Devèze (1956–2015), French association football manager, active primarily in Africa with the national teams of Guinea, Gabon, and Benin
Serge Diaghilev (1872–1929), Russian art critic, patron, ballet impresario, and founder of the Ballets Russes
Serge Dié (born 1977), Ivorian footballer
Serge Le Dizet (born 1964), French football coach who had a playing career
Serge Djekanovic (born 1983), Serbian-born Canadian retired professional soccer player
Serge Djiehoua (born 1983), Ivorian former football player
Serge Doubrovsky (born 1928), French writer and 1989 Prix Médicis winner for Le Livre Brisé
Serge Dube (born 1979), Canadian former professional ice hockey defenceman
Serge Ducosté (born 1944), Haitian football defender
Serge Duigou (born 1948), French historian, specializing in the history of Brittany
Serge Dupire (born 1958), Canadian actor
Serge Duvernois (born 1960), French former footballer
Serge Edongo (born 1982), Cameroonian professional volleyball player
Serge Elisséeff (1889–1975), Russian-French scholar, Japanologist, and professor at Harvard University
Jean Serge Essous (1935–2009), Congolese saxophonist, clarinetist, and co-founder of the Afrika Team in Paris, France
Serge Raynaud de la Ferriere (1916–1962), French religious philosopher
Serge Fiori (born 1952), the lead vocalist and guitarist for Harmonium, an influential progressive rock band from Quebec
Serge Fontaine (born 1947), Canadian politician in the province Quebec
Eric Serge Gagne (born 1976), former Major League Baseball pitcher
Serge Gainsbourg, born Lucien Ginsburg (1928–1991), French singer, songwriter, poet, composer, artist, actor, and director
Serge Gakpé (born 1987), French-born Togolese football midfielder
Serge Garant, OC (1929–1986), Canadian composer, conductor, and professor of music at the University of Montreal
Serge de Gastyne (1930–1992), French-American composer and pianist born in Paris, France
Serge Gavronsky (born 1932), American poet and translator
Serge & Christine Ghisoland (born 1946), Belgian singing duo who participated in the 1972 Eurovision Song Contest
Serge Gilles (born 1936), the leader of the Fusion of Haitian Social Democrats political party
Serge Girard (born 1953), French ultramarathon runner
Serge Gnabry, German professional footballer
Serge Godard (born 1936), French politician
Anne & Serge Golon or Anne Golon (born 1921), French author, better known to English-speaking readers as Sergeanne Golon
Serge Golon (1903–1972), writer and the husband of French author Anne Golon, in collaboration with whom he wrote the Angélique series
Serge Golovach (born 1970), Russian contemporary artist
Serge Grouard (born 1959), member of the National Assembly of France
Serge Gruzinski (born 1949), French historian and Latin Americanist
Serge Guinchard (born 1946), French jurist, teacher, and emeritus professor of Pantheon-Assas University
Serge Gumienny (born 1972), Belgian former football referee
Serge Halimi (born 1955), French journalist with the Le Monde Diplomatic since 1992
Serge Haroche (born 1944), French physicist
Serge Hélan (born 1964), French retired triple jumper, known for his bronze medal at the 1995 World Indoor Championships
Serge Honi (born 1973), Cameroonian retired footballer who played as a forward
Serge Houde (born 1953), Canadian film and television character actor
Serge Hovey (1920–1989), American composer and ethnomusicologist
Serge Huo-Chao-Si (born 1968), French contemporary artist and comic book creator
Serge Hutin (1927–1997), French author on books on esoterica and the occult
Serge Ibaka (born 1989), Spanish professional basketball player of Congolese origins
Serge Osmena, III (born 1943), Filipino politician and legislator who served as a Senator of the Philippines
Serge Ivanoff (1893–1983), Russian painter
Serge Janquin (born 1943), member of the National Assembly of France
Serge Jaroff (1896–1985), Russian-American founder, conductor, and composer of the Don Cossack Choir Serge Jaroff
Serge Jentgen (born 1962), retired Luxembourgian football midfielder
Serge Joyal, PC-OC OQ (born 1945), Canadian senator
Serge July (born 1942), French journalist, founder of the daily Libération, and a prominent figure in French politics
Serge Kampf (born 1934), French businessman who founded the computer services company Capgemini in 1967
Serge Karlow (c. 1921–2005), American CIA Technical Officer falsely accused of treason and forced to resign
Serge Klarsfeld (born 1935), Romanian-born French activist and Nazi hunter known for documenting the Holocaust in order to establish the record and to enable the prosecution of war criminals
Serge-Christophe Kolm (born 1932), French public economist, econometrician, and political philosopher
Serge (Konovaloff) (1941–2003), archbishop of Western Europe of the Ecumenical Patriarchate of the Eastern Orthodox church from 1993–2003
Serge Korber (born 1936), French film director and screenwriter
Konan Serge Kouadio (born 1988), Ivorian footballer
Serge Koussevitzky (1874–1951), Russian-born Jewish conductor, composer, double bassist, music director of the Boston Symphony Orchestra 1924 to 1949
Serge Kwetche (born 1976), Cameroonian footballer in midfielder role
Serge Lagauche (born 1940), former member of the Senate of France, representing the Val-de-Marne department
Serge Lairle (born 1956), French rugby union former footballer and a current coach
Serge Lajeunesse (born 1950), Canadian retired professional ice hockey defenceman
Serge Lama (born 1943), French singer and songwriter
Serge Lamothe (born 1963), French-Canadian writer
Serge Lancel (1928–2005), French archaeologist and philologist
Serge Lang (1927–2005), French-born American mathematician
Serge Lang (skiing) (1920–1999), French journalist, alpine skier, and the founder of the alpine skiing World Cup
Serge Larcher (born 1945), member of the Senate of France, representing the island of Martinique
Serge Latouche (born 1940, Vannes), French emeritus professor in economy at the University of Paris-Sud
Serge Lazareff (born 1944), Australian actor and scriptwriter
Serge Lebovici (1915–2000), French psychiatrist and psychoanalyst
Serge Leclaire (1924–1994), French psychiatrist and psychoanalyst
Serge LeClerc (1950–2011), pardoned Canadian ex-criminal, former politician and co-author of the autobiography Untwisted
Serge Legat or Sergei Legat (1875–1905), Russian ballet dancer
Serge Legendre, French research scientist in the field of paleobiology with the Institute of Paleoenvironment & PaleoBiosphere, University of Lyon
Serge Lehman (born 1964), the main pseudonym of the French science fiction writer Pascal Fréjean
Serge Lemoyne (1941–1998), Canadian artist from Quebec
Serge Lenoir (born 1947), retired French football player who played for Rennes, SC Bastia and Stade Brestois
Serge Lepeltier (born 1953), French politician
Serge Letchimy (born 1953), member of the National Assembly of France
Serge Leveur (born 1957), retired French pole vaulter
François-Serge Lhabitant, the chief investment officer of Kedge Capital Fund Management Ltd, professor of finance at the Edhec Business School
Serge Lifar (1905–1986), French ballet dancer and choreographer of Ukrainian origin
Serge Lilo (born 1985), rugby union player who represents the Wellington Lions in the Air New Zealand Cup and the Hurricanes in Super Rugby
Serge Alain Liri (born 1979), Côte d'Ivoire footballer
Serge-Paul Loga or Paul Loga (born 1969), retired Cameroonian football
Serge Losique (born 1931), the founder & president of the Montreal World Film Festival since its opening
Serge Lutens (born 1942), French photographer, filmmaker, hair stylist, perfume art director and fashion designer
Serge Maguy (born 1970), retired Ivorian football player
Serge Makofo (born 1986), Congolese professional footballer
Serge Malé, French senior UN official working for the Office of the United Nations High Commissioner for Refugees
Serge Marcil PC (1944–2010), educator, administrator and politician in Quebec, Canada
Christian Serge Maronga (1959–2008), Gabonese politician and president of the Rally of Democrats (RDD) party
Serge Marquand (1930–2004), French actor and film producer
Serge Masnaghetti (born 1934), French former professional football (soccer) player
Serge Maury (born 1946), French sailor and Olympic champion
Serge Mayifuila, Congolese-born business owner, philanthropist
Serge Ménard (born 1941), Quebec politician from Canada
Serge Merlin (1932–2019), French actor
Serge Mesonès (1948–2001), French footballer
Serge Mimpo (born 1974), Cameroonian professional football player
Joseph Serge Miot (1946–2010), Haitian archbishop of the Roman Catholic Church
Serge Moati (born 1946), French artist, journalist, film director and writer
Serge Mombouli, the Republic of the Congo's ambassador to the United States since 2001
Serge Monast (1945–1996), Québécois investigative journalist, poet, essayist and conspiracy theorist
Serge Moscovici (born 1925), Romanian-born French social psychologist, director of the Laboratoire Européen de Psychologie Sociale
Serge Mouille (1922–1988), French industrial designer and goldsmith
Serge Mputu Mbungu (born 1980), Congolese footballer
Serge Muhmenthaler (born 1953), retired Swiss football player and referee
Serge Netchaiev or Sergey Nechayev (1847–1882), Russian revolutionary associated with the Nihilist movement
Serge N'Gal (born 1986), Cameroonian footballer
Serge Emaleu Ngomgoue (born 1985), Cameroonian footballer
Serge-Junior Martinsson Ngouali (born 1992), Swedish footballer of Caribbean and Central African Republic descent
Serge Nigg (1924–2008), French composer
Serge Nilus or Sergei Nilus (1862–1929), Russian religious writer and self-described mystic
Serge Noskov (born 1956), composer
Serge Nubret (1938–2011), French professional bodybuilder, bodybuilding federation leader, movie actor and author
Serge Blanchard Oba, Congolese politician
Serge Obolensky (1890–1978), Russian prince and vice chairman of the board of Hilton Hotels Corporation
Serge Michel Odzoki (born 1948), Congolese politician
Serge Oldenburg (1863–1934), Russian orientalist who specialized in Buddhist studies
Serge Ornem, Paralympian athlete from France competing mainly in category T46 sprint events
Serge Panizza (born 1942), French fencer
Serge Pankejeff (1886–1979), Russian aristocrat from Odessa known for being a patient of Sigmund Freud, who gave him the pseudonym Wolf Man
Serge Parsani (born 1952), Italian professional road bicycle racer, who won one stage in the 1979 Tour de France
Serge Pauwels (born 1983), Belgian professional road bicycle racer for UCI ProTour Omega Pharma-Quick Step
Serge Payer (born 1979), Canadian professional ice hockey player
Serge Pizzorno (born 1980), British guitarist and songwriter, worked with the indie rock band Kasabian
Serge Poignant (born 1947), member of the National Assembly of France
Serge Poliakoff (1906–1969), Russian-born French modernist painter belonging to the 'New' Ecole de Paris (Tachisme)
Serge de Poligny (1903–1983), French screenwriter and film director
Serge Poltoratzky (1803–1884), Russian literary scholar, bibliophile and humanitarian
Serge Postigo (born 1968), Quebec actor originally from France
Serge Prokofiev (1891–1953), Russian composer, pianist and conductor
Serge Quisquater, Belgian musician born in Leuven in 1965
Serge Rachmaninoff (1873–1943), Russian composer, pianist, and conductor
Serge Racine (born 1951), Haitian football defender
Serge of Radonezh (c. 1314–1392), spiritual leader and monastic reformer of medieval Russia
Serge Reding (1941–1975), Belgian weightlifter
Serge Reggiani (1922–2004), Italian-born French singer and actor
Serge Reid (born 1963), Canadian curler from Jonquière, Quebec
Serge Ricard, professor of American Civilization at the University of Paris III-Sorbonne Nouvelle
Serge Roberge (born 1965), professional ice hockey player
Serge Robert (born 1970), Quebec musician who sings in French
Serge Robichaud, Canadian politician, elected to the Legislative Assembly of New Brunswick in the 2010 provincial election
Serge Romano (born 1964), French retired professional football defender
Serge Roques (born 1947), French politician and Mayor of Villefranche-de-Rouergue (Aveyron)
Serge Roullet (1926–2023), French film director and screenwriter
Serge Rousseau (1930–2007), French film and television actor and agent
Serge Rubanraut (1948–2008), Australian chess master
Serge Rudaz (born 1954), Canadian theoretical physicist and professor of physics at the University of Minnesota
Serge Saltykov (1726–1765), Russian officer (chamberlain) who became the first lover of Empress Catherine the Great after her arrival to Russia
Serge Sargsian (born 1954), the third and current president of Armenia
Serge Sauneron (1927–1976), French Egyptologist
Serge Sauvion (1929–2010), French actor
Serge Savard, OC, CQ (born 1946), Canadian retired professional ice hockey defenceman
Serge Schmemann (born 1945), American writer and editorial page editor of the International Herald Tribune, the global edition of the New York Times
Serge Semenenko (1903–1980), Ukrainian-born Hollywood banker in the 1950s and 1960s, representing the First National Bank of Boston
Victor Serge (1890–1947), Russian revolutionary and writer
Serge Silberman (1917–2003), French film producer
Serge Simard (born 1950), Canadian politician in the province of Quebec
Serge Sorokko (born 1954), American art dealer, publisher and owner of the Serge Sorokko Gallery in San Francisco
Serge Souchon-Koguia (born 1987), Central African Republican footballer
Serge Soudoplatoff, French technologist, commentator, and author
Serge Spitzer, Romanian-born American artist
Serge Alexandre Stavisky (1886–1934), French financier and embezzler
Serge Sudeikin (1882–1946), Russian artist and set-designer associated with the Ballets Russes and the Metropolitan Opera
Serge Tatiefang (born 1987), Cameroonian defensive midfielder
Serge Tcherepnin (born 1941), American composer and electronic instrument builder of Russian-Chinese origin
Serge Tchuruk (born 1937), French businessman of Armenian descent
Serge Testa, Australian yachtsman who holds the world record for the circumnavigation in the smallest boat, completing the voyage in 1987
Serge Teyssot-Gay (born 1963), French former guitarist of rock group Noir Désir
Serge Thériault (born 1948), Quebec comedian and actor
Serge Thion (born 1942), French sociologist
Serge Timashev (born 1937), Russian scientist performing research for USPolyResearch
Serge Torsarkissian, Lebanese member of parliament representing the Armenian Catholic seat in Beirut
Serge Toussaint, Haitian-American artist and muralist
Serge Trifkovic (born 1954), Serbian-American writer on international affairs, foreign affairs editor for the paleoconservative magazine Chronicles
Serge Tsmikeboki (born 1967), former professional footballer who played as a striker
Serge Turgeon, CM, CQ (1946–2004), Quebec actor and union leader
Serge Vandercam (1924–2005), Belgian painter, photographer, sculptor, and ceramist associated with the CoBrA group
Serge Vaudenay (born 1968), French cryptographer
Serge Venturini (born 1955), French poet
Serge Vinçon (1949–2007), French politician of the UMP party
Serge Vohor (born 1955), Vanuatuan politician
Serge Voronoff (1866–1951), French surgeon of Russian extraction, grafted monkey testicle tissue onto the testicles of men
Serge Wawa (born 1986), Ivorian football defender
Serge Weinberg (born 1951), French founder and chairman of the investment firm Weinberg Capital Partners
Serge Julievich, Count Witte (1849–1915), Russian policy-maker who presided over extensive industrialization within the Russian Empire
Serge Wolkonsky (1860–1937), Russian theatrical worker, one of the first Russian proponents of eurhythmics
Serge Yoffou (born 1971), Ivorian former international footballer, who played in his career as a forward
Serge Zwikker (born 1973), Dutch-American former basketball player

List of people with given name Sergei or Sergey 
Sascha Schapiro, anarchist revolutionary who used the nom de guerre Sergei
Sergei Agababov, Russian composer
Sergei Andrejev, Estonian Communist politician
Sergei Berezin (born 1971), Russian former ice hockey winger
Sergei Bobrovsky, Russian NHL ice hockey player
Sergei Viktorovich Bochkarev (born 1941), Russian mathematician
Sergei Bodrov (born 1948), Russian film director, screenwriter, and producer
Sergei Bodrov Jr (1971–2002), Russian actor, and film director
Sergei Bondarchuk (1920–1994), Soviet film director
Sergey Brin (born 1973), American entrepreneur and co-founder of Google
Sergei Brushko, Belarusian photographer
Sergey Bubka, Ukrainian pole vaulter
Sergei Diaghilev, founder of Ballets Russes
Sergei Dovlatov, Russian writer and dissident
Sergei Eisenstein, Soviet film director
Sergei Fedorov, Russian NHL ice hockey player
Sergey Furgal (born 1970), Russian politician, former governor of the Khabarovsk kray, political prisoner
Sergei Gonchar, Russian NHL ice hockey player
Sergei Grinkov, Russian ice skating champion
Sergey Grishin (businessman), Russian entrepreneur
Sergei Issakov, Estonian literary scholar and politician
Sergei Kharitonov, Russian Mixed Martial Arts fighter
Sergey Karjakin, Russian (formerly Ukrainian) chess grandmaster
Sergey Kirov, Soviet revolutionary leader
Sergey Kiselnikov (1958–2020), Soviet footballer
Sergei Korolev, Soviet rocket engineer
Sergei Korolev, Russian intelligence officer
Sergei Korolev, Russian founder of industrial microbiology 
Sergei Kourdakov, former KGB agent who defected to Canada
Sergey Lazarev (born 1983), Russian pop singer/opera actor
Sergey Lavrov (born 1950), Russian foreign minister
Sergey Lebedev (footballer), Uzbekistani football midfielder
Sergey Leonov (born 1983), Russian politician
Sergey Lyakhov, Russian discus thrower and shot putter
Sergei Lyapunov, Russian musician and composer
Sergey Lukyanenko, Russian science fiction and fantasy writer
Sergei Makarov (ice hockey, born 1958), NHL and Soviet National ice-hockey player
Sergei Nakariakov, Russian trumpeter
Sergei Novikov (mathematician), Soviet and Russian mathematician
Sergei Polunin, Principal dancer of The Royal Ballet
Sergei Prokofiev, Russian composer
Sergei Rachmaninoff, Russian musician and composer
Sergii Radonezhsky, spiritual leader of medieval Russia
Sergey Rikhter (born 1989), Israeli Olympic sport shooter
Sergey Rusin, Soviet freestyle swimmer
Sergei Ryabkov, Deputy Foreign Minister of the Russian Federation.
Sergey Ryabtsev, Russian violin player with Gogol Bordello
Sergei Sakhnovsky, Israeli ice dancer
Sergei Samsonov, Russian ice hockey player
Sergei Savin (singer), Russian singer, first winner of Faktor A
Sergey Sharikov, Russian 2x Olympic champion saber fencer
Sergey Shoygu, Minister of Defence of the Russian Federation
Sergei Shtsherbakov (1871–1937), Estonian farmer and politician
Sergey Sobyanin (born 1958), Russiann politician and current mayor of the city of Moscow
Sergei Stanishev, former Bulgarian prime minister
Sergey Stepanov (musician), Moldovan saxophonist
Sergei Tabachnikov, Russian mathematician
Sergei Tikhanovsky, is a Belarusian pro-democracy activist, political prisoner, husband of elected president of Belarus Svetlana Tikhanovskaya
Serguei Tetioukine, Russian volleyball player
Sergei Tretyakov (intelligence officer), Russian SVR defector
Sergey Usenya, Belarusian footballer
Sergei Yesenin, Russian poet
Sergey Zagraevsky (1964–2020), Russian painter
Sergei Zelenov (born 1980), Russian footballer
Sergey Zimov (born 1955), Russian geophysicist and creator of Pleistocene Park
Sergei Zjukin (born 1972), Estonian chess player

List of people with given name Sergej
 Sergej Ćetković
 Sergej Milinković-Savić
 Sergej Sekulović
 Sergej Trifunović

List of people with given name Sergi
 Sergi Agustí, Spanish film director
 Sergi Barjuán, footballer
 Sergi Belbel, Spanish Catalan playwright
 Sergi Bruguera, Spanish tennis player
 Sergio Dalma, a Spanish singer whose real name is Josep Sergi Capdevila
 Sergi Durán, tennis player
 Sergi Enrich Spanish footballer
 Sergi Escobar, Spanish world champion track cyclist
 Sergi Gómez, Spanish footballer
 Sergi Gvarjaladze, Georgian TV and radio presenter, film director, producer and musician
 Sergi Jordà, Spanish Catalan innovator, installation artist, digital musician
 Sergi López Segú, footballer
 Sergi López i Ayats, actor
 Sergi Pàmies, Spanish Catalan writer, translator, journalist and television and radio presenter
 Sergi Pedrerol, Spanish water polo player
 Sergi Roberto, Spanish footballer
 Sergi Vidal, Spanish basketball player

List of people with given name Sergio or Sérgio 
Sérgio Abreu (actor) (born 1975), Brazilian actor
Sergio Acevedo (born 1956), Argentine politician
Sergio Aguayo (born 1947), Mexican academic and activist
Sergio Agüero, Argentine footballer
Sergio Ahumada (born 1948), Chilean footballer
Sergio Albert (born 1951), American football player
Sergio Albeverio (born 1939), Swiss mathematician
Sergio Alcántara (born 1996), Dominican baseball player
Sergio Alfafara (born 1920), Cebuano Visayan writer
Sergio Allievi (born 1964), German footballer
Sergio Aragonés (born 1937), cartoonist and writer
Sergio Almaguer (born 1969), Mexican coach and footballer
Sergio Bailey (born 1994), American football player
Sergio Bernardo Almirón (born 1980), Argentine footballer
Sergio Omar Almirón (born 1958), Argentine footballer 
Sergio Oscar Almirón (born 1985), Argentine footballer
Sergio Fernández Álvarez (born 1975), Spanish footballer
Sérgio Estanislau do Amaral (1925–1996), Brazilian geologist
Sergio Amidei, Italian screenwriter
Sergio Zarzar Andonie (born 1952), Chilean entrepreneur and politician
Sérgio da Silva Andrade (born 1982), Portuguese footballer
Sergio Andreoli (born 1922), Italian footballer
Sergio Salvador Aguirre Anguiano (born 1943), Mexican jurist
Sérgio Chapelin (born 1941), Brazilian Presenter
Sergio Apostol (born 1935), Filipino lawyer and politician
Sergio Aquino (born 1979), Argentine–Paraguayan footballer
Sergio Aragonés, cartoonist
Sergio Aragoneses (born 1977), Spanish footballer
Sergio Araujo (born 1992), Argentine footballer
Sérgio Araújo, Brazilian footballer
Sérgio Luís de Araújo (born 1970), Brazilian footballer
Sergio Méndez Arceo (1907–1992), Mexican bishop and activist
Sergio Arias (born 1988), Mexican footballer
Sergio Arredondo, Mexican bullfighter
Sergio Arruda, Brazilian diplomat
Sergio Asenjo, Spanish footballer
Sergio Assad, Brazilian guitarist and composer
Sergio Atzeni (1952–1995), Italian writer
Sergio Ávila, Mexican footballer
Sergio Babb (born 1982), Dutch footballer
Sergio Bagú (1911–2002), Argentinian Marxist historian, sociologist and political philosopher
Sergio Balanzino (born 1934), Italian diplomat
Sergio Ballesteros (born 1975), Spanish footballer
Sergio Hugo Sánchez Ballivián, Bolivian diplomat
Sergio Barbarossa, Italian engineer
Silvio Sergio Bonaccorsi Barbato (1959–2009), Italian-Brazilian conductor and composer
Sergio Barbero (born 1969), Italian racing cyclist
Sergio Paulo Barbosa (born 1980), aka Duda, Portuguese footballer
Sérgio Baresi (born 1973), Brazilian footballer
Sérgio Filipe da Silva Barge (born 1984), Portuguese footballer
Sergio Barila (born 1973), Spanish–Equatoguinean footballer
Sergio Villarreal Barragán (born 1969), Mexican federal police officer
Sergio Barreda (1951–2002), Peruvian surfer and surfboard shaper
Sergio Basañez (born 1970), telenovela actor
Sergio Bastida (born 1979), Argentine footballer
Sergio Batista (born 1962), Argentine footballer
Sergio Battistini (born 1963), Italian footballer
Sergio Bello (Intra, 6 May 1942), Italian sprinter
Sergio Benedetti (born 1942), Italian art historian
Sergio Gutiérrez Benítez (born 1945), Mexican priest and wrestler
Sergio Bergamelli (born 1970), Italian alpine skier
Sergio Berlato (born 1959), Italian politician
Sergio Berlinguer (1934–2021), Italian diplomat
Sergio Berlioz (born 1963), composer and musicologist
Sergio Bernal (born 1970), Mexican footballer
Sergio Henrique Savoia Bernardes (born 1973), Brazilian footballer
Sergio Bernardino (born 1953), footballer
Júlio Sérgio Bertagnoli (born 1978), Brazilian footballer
Sergio Berti (nicknamed La Bruja; born 1969), Argentine footballer
Sergio Bertoni (1915–1995), Italian footballer
Paulo Sérgio Betanin (born 1986), Brazilian footballer
Sergio Bianchetto (born 1939), Italian Olympic racing cyclist
Sergio Bizzio, Argentine writer and director
Sergio Blanco (born 1981), Uruguayan footballer
Sergio Bonelli (1932–2011), Italian comic-book author and publisher
Sergio Boris, Argentine film actor
Sergio Álvarez Boulet (born 1979), Cuban weightlifter
Sergio Braga (born 1984), Brazilian footballer
Sergio Moraes Castanheira Brandao, Brazilian TV journalist and science communicator
Sergio Bravo (born 1927), Mexican footballer
Sergio Brighenti (born 1932), Italian footballer and coach
Sergio Brio (born 1956), Italian footballer
Paulo Sérgio Bento Brito (born 1968), Portuguese footballer and coach
Sérgio Britto (born 1959), Brazilian keyboardist and singer
Sergio Brown (born 1988), American football player
Sergio Bruni (1921–2003), Italian singer, guitarist and songwriter
Sergio Bueno (born 1962), Mexican football manager
Sergio Bufarini (born 1963), Argentine footballer
Sérgio Burgani, Brazilian clarinetist
Sergio Buso (1950–2011), Italian footballer and coach
Sergio Busquets (born 1988), Spanish footballer
Sergio Bustamante (artist), Mexican sculptor
Sergio Bustamante (1934–2014), Mexican actor
Sergio Bustos (born 1972), Argentine footballer
Sergio Cabrera (disambiguation), several people
Sergio Calderon (born 2000), American singer in the band In Real Life
Sergio Calligaris (born 1941), Argentine pianist and composer
Sergio de Camargo (1930–1990), Brazilian 
Sergio Cammariere (born 1960), Italian jazz singer and songwriter
Sergio Campana (footballer) (born 1934), Italian lawyer and footballer
Sergio Campana (racing driver) (born 1986), Italian racing driver
Sergio Campbell (born 1992), Jamaican footballer
Sergio Canales (born 1991), Spanish footballer
Sergio Canamasas (born 1988), Spanish racing driver
Sergio Alejandro Ortega Cantero (born 1988), Paraguayan footballer
Sergio Caprari (born 1932), Italian Olympic boxer
Sergio Caputo (born 1954), Italian artist, composer and guitarist
Sergio Cariello (born 1964), Brazilian-American comic-book artist
Sergio Carlo (born 1977), Dominican actor
Sérgio Manuel Costa Carneiro (nicknamed Serginho; born 1991), Portuguese footballer
Sergio Carnesalini (born 1982), Italian footballer
Sergio Carpanesi (born 1936), Italian footballer and coach
Sergio Casal (born 1962), Spanish tennis player
Sergio Cassiano (born 1967), Brazilian composer, percussionist, writer, producer, and bandleader
Sergio Castelletti (1937–2004), Italian footballer and manager
Sergio Castellitto (born 1953), Italian actor and director
Sergio Díaz Castilla (born 1991), Spanish footballer
Sergio Badilla Castillo (born 1947), Chilean poet
Sergio Rogelio Castillo (born 1970), Argentine–Bolivian footballer
Sergio de Castro (disambiguation), several people
Matteo Sergio Cavagna (born 1985), Italian footballer
Sergio Cervato (1929–2005), Italian footballer
Sergio Chejfec, Argentine Jewish writer
Sergio Chiamparino (born 1948), Italian politician
Sergio Ciattaglia, Argentine footballer
Sergio Citti (1933–2005), Italian film director and screenwriter
Sergio Clerici (born 1941), Brazilian footballer
Sergio Peña Clos (born 1927), Puerto Rican politician
Sergio Codognato (born 1944), Italian footballer and coach
Sergio Cofferati (born 1948), Italian politician and union leader
Sergio Coggiola, Italian automobile designer
Sérgio Mendes Coimbra (born 1988), Brazilian footballer
Sérgio Comba (born 1979), Argentine footballer
Sérgio Conceição (born 1974), Portuguese footballer
Sergio Álvarez Conde (born 1986), Spanish footballer
Sergio Contreras (born 1980), Mexican baseball player
Sergio Corbucci (1927–1990), Italian film director
Sergio Corino (born 1974), Spanish footballer
Sergio Coronado (born 1970), member of the National Assembly of France
Sergio Corrieri (1938–2008), Cuban actor
Sergio Cortes (born 1968), Chilean tennis player
Mário Sérgio Santos Costa (born 1990), Brazilian footballer
Paulo Sergio da Costa (footballer) (born 1979), Portuguese footballer
Sergio Rafael da Costa (born 1985), Brazilian footballer
Sergio Coterón (born 1961), basketball player
Sérgio Pereira Couto (born 1967), Portuguese-Brazilian writer
Sergio Cragnotti (born 1940), Italian entrepreneur and author
Sergio Cravero, the chief executive officer (CEO) of Italian car maker Alfa Romeo until spring 2010
Sergio Cresto (USA) (1956–1986), co-driver of Henri Toivonen for the 1986 World Rally Championship season
Sérgio Eduardo Ferreira da Cunha (born 1972), Brazilian footballer
Sergio Dalma, Spanish pop singer
Sergio D'Asnasch (born 1934), Italian sprinter
Sergio DellaPergola (born 1942), Italian-born Israeli professor and demographic expert
Sergio Denis (born 1949), Argentine singer-songwriter and actor
Sérgio Dias (born 1951), Brazilian rock musician, composer and guitarist
Sérgio Rodrigo Penteado Dias (born 1980), Brazilian footballer
Sergio Álvarez Díaz (born 1992), Spanish footballer
Sergio Díaz (footballer, born 1985) (born 1985), Spanish footballer
Sergio Diduch, Argentine footballer
Sergio van Dijk (born 1982), Dutch footballer
Sergio Doménech (born 1976), Spanish judoka
Sergio Domini (born 1961), Italian football player
Sergio Donati (born 1933), Italian screenwriter
Sérgio Luís Donizetti (born 1964), footballer
Sergio Dorantes (born 1946), Mexican photojournalist jailed for the murder of his wife
Sergio de Queiroz Duarte (born 1934), Brazilian diplomat
Sergio Echigo (born 1945), Nisei Japanese Brazilian footballer
Sergio Endrigo (1933–2005), Italian singer-songwriter
Sergio Ermotti, Swiss banker
Sergio Escalante (born 1986), Argentine footballer
Sergio Escalona, American baseball player
Sergio Escobar (born 1974), Spanish track cyclist
Sergio Escobedo (1931–2009), Mexican modern pentathlete and fencer
Sergio Escudero (footballer born 1983), Argentine footballer
Sergio Escudero (footballer born 1964), Argentine-Japanese footballer
Sergio Escudero (footballer born 1988), naturalized Japanese footballer
Sergio Escudero Palomo (born 1989), Spanish footballer
Sergio Esquenazi (born 1974), Argentine filmmaker
Sergio y Estíbaliz (born 1948), Spanish singer
Sergio Fachelli, Uruguayan singer and songwriter
Sergio Fajardo, Colombian mathematician and politician
Sergio Fantoni, (born 1930), Italian actor
Sérgio Farias (born 1967), Brazilian football manager
Sergio Fedee (born 1983), West Indian cricketer
Sergio Marqués Fernández (1946–2012), Spanish politician and lawyer
Sergio Ferrara (born 1945), Italian physicist
Sergio Ferrari (born 1943), Italian footballer
Sérgio Henrique Ferreira (born 1934), Brazilian physician and pharmacologist
Sergio Ferrer (born 1951), American baseball player
Sérgio Ferro (born 1938), Brazilian painter, architect, and professor
Sergio Gutiérrez Ferrol (born 1989), Spanish tennis player
Sérgio Cabral Filho (born 1963), Brazilian politician and journalist
Sérgio Paulo Nascimento Filho (born 1988), footballer
Sergio Fiorentino (1927–1998), Italian pianist
Sergio Flamigni (born 1925), Italian politician and writer
Sérgio Paranhos Fleury (1933–1979), Brazilian police deputy
Sergio Floccari (born 1981), Italian footballer
Sergio Flores (born 1985), Bolivian–American footballer
Sergio Focardi, Italian physicist and professor
Sergio Franchi (1926–1990), Italian tenor and actor
Sergio Francisco (born 1979), Spanish footballer
Sergio Frascoli (born 1936), Italian footballer
Sergio Frusoni (1901–1975), Cape Verdean Creole-language poet
Sergio Fubini (1928–2005), Italian theoretical physicist
Sergio García de la Fuente (born 1983), Spanish footballer
Sergio Furlan (born 1940), Italian Olympic sailor
Sergio García, Spanish golfer
Sergio González Soriano, Spanish footballer
Sergio Goyri (born 1958), Mexican actor
Sergio Baris Gucciardo, Turkish footballer
Sergio Hellings, Dutch footballer
Sergio Hernández (racing driver) (born 1983), Spanish racing driver
Sergio Hernández (basketball) (born 1963), Argentine basketball coach
Sergio Hernández (actor) (born 1945), Chilean actor
Sergio Jarlaz, Chilean singer
Sergio Kindle, American football player
Sergio Leone, Italian film director
Sérgio Manoel (disambiguation), multiple people
Sergio Marchionne, Italian businessman
Sergio Mariotti, Italian chess player
Sergio Markarian, Uruguayan football manager
Sergio Martínez (boxer), Argentine boxer
Sergio Martino, Italian film director
Sérgio Mendes, Brazilian musician
Sergio Momesso, Canadian ice hockey player
Sergio Moraes (born 1982), Brazilian mixed martial artist and Jiu-Jitsu fighter
Sergio Moreno (footballer, born 1992), Panamanian footballer
Sergio Oliva, American bodybuilder
Sergio Ortega, Chilean composer and pianist
Sergio Osmeña, president of the Philippines 1944–1946
Sergio Pellissier, Italian footballer
Sergio Pérez (born 1990), Mexican racing driver
Sergio Pininfarina, Italian automobile designer
Sergio Pizzorno, Guitarist and songwriter
Sergio Ramos, Spanish footballer
Sergio Renán, Argentine actor, director and screenwriter 
Sergio Rey, Spanish boxer
Sergio Rodriguez, Spanish basketball player
Sergio Roitman (born 1979), Argentine tennis player
Sergio Romo, American baseball player
Sergio Rosales, Venezuelan conductor
Sergio Rossi (1935–2020), Italian fashion designer
Sergio Rubini, Italian actor and film director
Sergio Santos (baseball), American baseball player
Sergio Savarese, Italian furniture designer
Sergio Scariolo, Italian basketball coach
Sérgio Sette Câmara, Brazilian race car driver
Sergio Sollima, Italian film director
Sergio Tacchini, Italian fashion designer
Sergio Tofano, Italian actor
Sergio Torres (footballer, born 1981), Argentine footballer
Sergio Troncoso (born 1961), American author of A Peculiar Kind of Immigrant’s Son and The Last Tortilla and Other Stories
Sergio Valenti, Argentine footballer
Sérgio Vieira de Mello, Brazilian diplomat
Sergio Villalobos, Chilean historian

List of people with given name Sergiu
Sergiu Băhăian, Romanian businessman, convicted fraudster, alleged leader of a criminal organization
Sergiu Balan (born 1987), Moldovan cross-country skier who has competed since 2006
Sergiu Bar (born 1980), Romanian footballer
Sergiu Brujan (born 1976), Romanian football player
Sergiu Burcă (born 1961), journalist and politician from Moldova
Sergiu Buș (born 1992), Romanian footballer
Sergiu Celac (born 1939), the first post-communist Romanian Minister of Foreign Affairs of Romania
Sergiu Celibidache (1912–1996), Romanian conductor, composer, and teacher
Sergiu Chircă, Moldovan politician
Sergiu Comissiona (1928–2005), Romanian conductor and violinist
Sergiu Costea (born 1983), Romanian football player
Sergiu Costin (born 1978), Romanian football player
Sergiu Cunescu (1923–2005), Romanian social democratic politician, leader of the Social Democratic Party of Romania 1990 to 2001
Sergiu Dan (1903–1976), Romanian novelist, journalist, Holocaust survivor and political prisoner of the communist regime
Sergiu Gavriliţă, husband of Rodica Ciorănică (born 1976), who is a journalist and editor from Moldova
Sergiu Grossu (1920–2009), writer and theologian from Romania
Sergiu Hart (born 1949), Israeli mathematician and economist and the past president of the Game Theory Society (2008–2010)
Sergiu Homei (born 1987), Romanian football player
Sergiu Klainerman (born 1950), mathematician known for his contributions to the study of hyperbolic differential equations and general relativity
Sergiu Luca (1943–2010), Romanian-born American violinist
Sergiu Mândrean (born 1978), Romanian professional football player
Sergiu Mocanu (June 6, 1961, Ciobalaccia) is a Moldovan politician
Sergiu Ionuț Moga (born 1992), Romanian footballer defender
Sergiu Musteaţă (born 1972), historian from the Republic of Moldova, president of the Association of Historians of Moldova
Sergiu Muth (born 1990), Romanian footballer
Sergiu Natra (born 1924), Israeli composer of Romanian birth
Sergiu Negruț (born 1993), Romanian professional football player
Sergiu Nicolaescu (born 1930), Romanian film director, actor and politician
Sergiu Niţă (1883–1940), politician and lawyer from Romania
Sergiu Rădăuţan (1926–1998), Moldovan physicist
Sergiu Radu (born 1977), Romanian professional footballer
Sergiu Samarian (1923–1991), Romanian–German chess master and coach
Sergiu Suciu (born 1990), Romanian professional footballer
Sergiu Toma (born 1987), Moldovan judoka
Sergiu Ursu (born 1980), Romanian discus thrower

List of people with given name Serj
Serj Sargsyan or Serzh Sargsyan (born 1954), third president of Armenia
Serj Tankian, Armenian-American musician/political activist

Fictional characters
Serge, the protagonist of Le Beau Serge, a French film directed by Claude Chabrol, released in 1958, and cited as the first movie of the Nouvelle Vague
Serge, the silent protagonist of the role-playing video game Chrono Cross
Serge Battour, one of the main characters of the manga series Kaze to Ki no Uta
Serge A. Storms, the main character of a series of novels by Tim Dorsey
Sergei Varishkov, alias Blanca, a Kazakh assassin in the manga and anime series Banana Fish
Sergey, a character in the fantasy novel Spinning Silver by Naomi Novik
Sergey Roskov, a character in the anime series Stellvia
Sergio, a parrot on the animated television series The Casagrandes
Sérgio, the main character of O Ateneu

See also
Gens Sergia
Sargis
Sarkis (disambiguation)
Serginho (disambiguation)
Sergius (disambiguation)
Sergejs, masculine Latvian given name
Sergiy, masculine Ukrainian given name
Sergei, the Finnish military nickname for the ZU-23-2 air defense cannon

References

Masculine given names
Italian masculine given names
Sammarinese given names